Destroy! was an American crust punk band from Minneapolis between 1988 and 1994. Vocalist Felix Havoc founded Havoc Records in 1992 as a vehicle for Destroy!'s Burn this Racist System Down 7-inch EP.

Members
Felix Havoc (Code 13, Damage Deposit)
Yngwie Markstein (Disembodied, Look Back and Laugh, No Statik)
Troll (Disrespect)
CyberNate Scabies (Brainoil, Stormcrow)
Mitch Useless (PersonHurter, Code 13, Servitude, Segue, Despise, Mördrot

 Discography 
Demos
 Create Chaos demo, AYF, (1989)

EPs
 Total Fucking Chaos 7-inch EP, Relapse (GTGP) Records, (1991)
 Burn this Racist System Down 7-inch EP (1992)

LPs
 The Basement Years cassette, AYF, (1990)
 Necropolis LP/CD, Sound Pollution, (1994)

Live albums
 Live @ CBGBs cassette, AYF, (1990)

Split albums
 Destroy!/Disrupt split 7-inch EP, Adversity Records, (1991)
 Destroy!/Disturb split 7-inch EP, (1995)

 Compilations 

 Son of Bllleeeeaaauuurrrrgghhh! 7-inch compilation, Slap A Ham
 Bloodless Unreality 7-inch comp.
 Crust & Anguished Life CD, MCR Recs., Japan. (1992)
 Songs For The Socially Retarded'' Cassette Compilation (Various Artists), Thrashing Mad

Timeline

External links
 destroy.net - destroy.net page about Destroy! by CyberNate Scabies.
 Havoc Records - Official Havoc Records website.

American crust and d-beat groups
Musical groups disestablished in 1994
Musical groups established in 1988
Hardcore punk groups from Minnesota